The 1977 European Curling Championships were held from November 22 to 26 at the Askerhallen arena in Oslo, Norway.

The Swedish men's team won their first European title, and the Swedish women's team won their second European title.

For the first time, the Dutch men's team took part in the European Championship.

Men's

Teams

Round robin

Final standings

Women's

Teams

Round robin

Final standings

References

European Curling Championships, 1977
European Curling Championships, 1977
European Curling Championships
Curling competitions in Norway
International sports competitions hosted by Norway
European Curling Championships
European Curling Championships
1970s in Oslo
International sports competitions in Oslo